The 2012–13 Southeast Missouri State Redhawks men's basketball team represented Southeast Missouri State University during the 2012–13 NCAA Division I men's basketball season. The Redhawks, led by fourth year head coach Dickey Nutt, played their home games at the Show Me Center and were members of the West Division of the Ohio Valley Conference. They finished the season 17–16, 8–8 in OVC play to finish in second place in the West Division. They lost in the quarterfinals of the OVC tournament to Eastern Kentucky.

Roster

Schedule

|-
!colspan=9| Exhibition

|-
!colspan=9| Regular season

|-
!colspan=9| 2013 OVC Basketball tournament

References

Southeast Missouri State Redhawks men's basketball seasons
Southeast Missouri State
2012 in sports in Missouri
2013 in sports in Missouri